Michael J. Hsu is an American civil servant who is the Acting Comptroller of the Currency. Prior to this role, Hsu served as an associate director in the Division of Supervision and Regulation at the Federal Reserve Board of Governors.

Secretary of the Treasury Janet Yellen designated Hsu as First Deputy Comptroller on May 10, 2021, making him the Acting Comptroller of the Currency.

As the Acting Comptroller of the Currency, Hsu holds an ex officio seat on the board of directors of the Federal Deposit Insurance Corporation.

References

External links
 Office of the Comptroller of the Currency biography

Living people
United States Comptrollers of the Currency
Federal Reserve Bank people
Biden administration personnel
Brown University alumni
George Washington University School of Business alumni
New York University School of Law alumni
20th-century American economists
21st-century American economists
Place of birth missing (living people)
Date of birth missing (living people)
Year of birth missing (living people)